
Gmina Leżajsk is a rural gmina (administrative district) in Leżajsk County, Subcarpathian Voivodeship, in south-eastern Poland. Its seat is the town of Leżajsk, although the town is not part of the territory of the gmina.

Villages
Gmina Leżajsk contains the villages and settlements of Biedaczów, Brzóza Królewska, Chałupki Dębniańskie, Dębno, Giedlarowa, Gwizdów, Hucisko, Maleniska, Piskorowice, Przychojec, Rzuchów, Stare Miasto and Wierzawice.

Neighbouring gminas
Gmina Leżajsk is bordered by the town of Leżajsk and by the gminas of Adamówka, Grodzisko Dolne, Krzeszów, Kuryłówka, Nowa Sarzyna, Rakszawa, Sieniawa, Sokołów Małopolski, Tryńcza and Żołynia.

References

 Polish official population figures 2006

Lezajsk
Leżajsk County